Ahmet Yektâ Madran (1885-1950) was a composer of Turkish music pieces, school songs, and marches.

Life 
Madran trained as a band musician at İzmir Art School and learned to play the clarinet. After school, he became the instructor for the military band in Edirne, where he received a serious injury to one of his eyes. In 1908, Madran joined the Mızıka-i Humayun. He was later sent for duty to Egypt, where he joined a German music ensemble. Madran toured with this ensemble as their soloist. After the declaration of the Turkish Republic, Madran was appointed as the conductor of the Presidential Symphony Orchestra, now called the Riyaset-i Cumhur in Ankara.

See also 
 List of composers of classical Turkish music

External links 
 

Expatriates from the Ottoman Empire in Egypt
Composers of Ottoman classical music
Composers of Turkish makam music
1885 births
1950 deaths